Arene tricarinata is a species of sea snail, a marine gastropod mollusk in the family Areneidae.

Description

The shell can grow to be 3 mm to 12 mm in length.

Distribution
Arene tricarinata can be found from North Carolina to Colombia and Northeast Brazil.

References

Areneidae
Gastropods described in 1872